Coatlán may refer to a number of places and languages in Mexico:

Geography
Coatlán del Río, Morelos
San Pablo Coatlán, Oaxaca
San Sebastián Coatlán, Oaxaca
San Vicente Coatlán, Oaxaca
San Miguel Coatlán, Oaxaca
San Jerónimo Coatlán, Oaxaca

Languages
Santo Domingo Coatlán Zapotec
Coatlán Mixe, or Isthmus Mixe